Sachar Blank (born July 10, 1985) is a German professional ice hockey player currently playing with Heilbronner Falken of the German 2nd Bundesliga. He has previously playing for Adler Mannheim and the Hannover Scorpions in the Deutsche Eishockey Liga (DEL).

References

External links

1985 births
Living people
Sportspeople from Karaganda
German people of Kazakhstani descent
Kazakhstani people of German descent
Citizens of Germany through descent
German ice hockey left wingers
Adler Mannheim players
Hannover Scorpions players